Stardust We Are is the third studio album by the progressive rock band The Flower Kings, which was released in 1997. It is the band's first double-CD studio album and includes the epic composition and title track, "Stardust We Are," which has since become one of the band's signature songs.

Track listing
All songs written and composed by Roine Stolt, except where noted.

Disc One

Disc Two

Credits
 Roine Stolt – electric & acoustic guitars, lead vocals, keyboards
 Tomas Bodin – Waldorf synthesizer, Hammond organ, Mellotron, piano, pipe organ, Rhodes piano, Optigan, accordion, effects
 Michael Stolt – bass guitar
 Jaime Salazar – drumkit
 Hasse Bruniusson – percussion
Hasse Fröberg – lead and backing vocals

Guests
 Ulf Wallander – soprano saxophone
 Håkan Almkvist – sitar, tabla

Production
 Hippiefied Art – book 
 Stefan Bodin – photography 
 Lilian Forsberg – photography 
 Dexter Frank Jr. – engineer, mixing 
 Per Nordin – photography
 David Palermo – artwork, image design

References

1997 albums
The Flower Kings albums
Inside Out Music albums